Zealand Pharma A/S is a Danish biotechnology research company, which designs and develops peptide-based medicines, mainly focusing on metabolic diseases like diabetes and obesity. The company's head office is situated in Søborg near Copenhagen, and it has close to 200 employees. In 2018, they opened a subsidiary in the US. Zealand Pharma forms part of the Danish-Swedish life science cluster Medicon Valley.

History 
Zealand Pharma A/S was founded in 1998 by Lars Hellerung Christiansen, Eva Steiness and Dr. Bjarne Due Larsen. As it was founded, it was a biopharmaceutical company focusing on design and development of peptide-based medicines, which would be brought to the market through partnerships with other multinational pharmaceutical companies.

In 2005, Zealand Pharma tried to be listed on the stock exchange, but had to resign for want of interest from investors. In 2010, they finally succeeded in being listed, and the stocks are now traded at the Copenhagen Stock Exchange (NASDAQ OMX København).

On January 15, 2015, Britt Meelby Jensen acquired the position as CEO from David Solomon, who had led the company during the years 2008–2014. In February 2019, Jensen left her position, and in April 2019, Emmanuel Dulac was chosen and inaugurated as CEO. Dulac has worked both European and American companies within the pharmaceutical industry.

In September 2019, the Dutch family foundation Van Herk Investments injected 560 million Danish Kroner (approx. 64 million pound sterling) into Zealand Pharma, which means the foundation owns a fifth of the company's shares. In October 2019, Zealand Pharma bought up the Canadian biotechnology company Encycle Therapeutics.

On March 30, 2022, Dr. Adam Steensberg assumed the position of Chief Executive Officer.

Product development 
Zealand Pharma does not promote and sell products in the market themselves, however, they form partnerships with several international pharmaceutical companies, who are responsible for placing the products on the market.

Zealand Pharma is mostly known and recognized for the diabetes medication Lyxumia, which has been developed in collaboration with the French pharmaceutical company Sanofi. Since 2014, Zealand Pharma has collaborated with the coronary care unit at Rigshospitalet in Copenhagen developing the medication Danegaptid, which should serve the purpose of preventing injuries in the tissue of the heart, frequently seen among angioplasty patients. Furthermore, they are developing several orphan drugs with government assistance. 

Because of the acquisition of the Canadian Encycle Therapeutics, Zealand Pharma now also possesses the right to develop and sell the pre-clinical candidate medication ET3764, which is also being developed for the treatment of diseases of the alimentary tract.

Product pipeline — Zealand pharma

References 

Pharmaceutical companies of Denmark